St James Street may refer to:

 St James's Street, a road in the St James's district of London, England
 St James Street railway station, a railway station in Waltham Forest, London, England
 St. James Street (Winnipeg) in Winnipeg, Canada
 Saint Jacques Street in Montreal, Canada

See also
 Rue Saint-Jacques (disambiguation)